Santa Cruz Bicycles is a manufacturer of high end mountain bikes based in Santa Cruz, California.  They sponsor the Santa Cruz Syndicate, a downhill racing team. The company moved premises from 104 Bronson Street to 2841 Mission Street in 2013 .  Formerly owned by NHS, Inc. On July 3, 2015, Santa Cruz Bicycles was sold to Pon Holdings, a family-owned Dutch conglomerate with a bicycle division including brands such as Cervélo, Focus and Royal Dutch Gazelle.

History 
Santa Cruz Bicycles was founded by Rob Roskopp, Mike Marquez and Rich Novak in 1993.  Roskopp had spent many years as a professional skateboarder, and Novak's Santa Cruz Skateboards company had put out a special "Roskopp" model before the two met. Roskopp and Novak went into partnership with bike engineer Mike Marquez, who had particular experience in bicycle suspension, and Tom Morris, a designer, to build some prototypes.

Their first bike, in 1994, was a full suspension bike called the Tazmon. It had an  travel single pivot design, the first on the market.  It was followed a year later by the  travel Heckler, a model that was discontinued for the 2016 model year and relaunched in 2020 as an e-bike.

The company acquired the patents for their Virtual Pivot Point (aka "VPP") from Outland Bikes around 1999.

Models

The company manufactures around a dozen models of mountain bikes made of carbon fiber and aluminum, ranging from $1500 to over $10000 retail. Their bikes are suited to a wide range of mountain biking disciplines.  Frame fabrication occurs in China and Taiwan, but all bicycles are assembled in Santa Cruz, built to customer specifications just before being shipped out.

In 2013, a single model, the "Juliana" was spun off as a stand-alone brand and range of mountain bikes for women, designed by and named for Juli Furtado.

In 2017, Santa Cruz announced the addition of carbon fiber wheels to their product lineup.

Current Santa Cruz/Juliana Production Models
 5010/Furtado - 27.5" wheels,  VPP Travel
 Blur - 29" wheels,  VPP Travel (Re-introduced in 2018)
 Tallboy/Joplin - 29" wheels,  VPP Travel
 Bronson/Roubion - 27.5" wheels,  VPP Travel
 Hightower - 29" wheels,  VPP Travel
Megatower - 29" wheels, 160 millimeters (6 in) VPP Travel
 Nomad - 27.5" wheels,  VPP Travel
 V10 - 27.5" wheels or 29" wheels,  VPP Travel
 Chameleon - 29" or 27.5"+ wheels, hardtail trail bike
 Highball - 29" wheels, hardtail xc bike
 Jackal - 26" wheels, dirt jump frame
 Stigmata - 700c wheels, cyclocross/gravel bike
 Heckler - 27.5" wheels, e-mountain bike,  VPP Travel (Re-introduced as e-bike in 2020)
 Bullit - MX (29" front wheel, 27.5 rear wheel) - Produced from 1998 to 2011 and then re-introduced as an e-bike in 2020 

Current Santa Cruz Production Wheel Models

 Reserve Carbon Wheels - 27.5 or 29" - 25, 27, 30, 37mm
 Reserve Aluminum Wheels - 27.5 or 29"

Discontinued Models
 Bantam
 Blur LT
 Blur XC
 Blur 4X
 Bullit
 Butcher
 Driver 8
 Heckler
 Juliana Cushtail
 Nickel
 Roadster
 Super 8
 Superlight
 Tallboy LT
 Tazmon
 VP Free
 HighTower LT

Santa Cruz Syndicate

Santa Cruz Syndicate is a sponsored downhill team affiliated with the company. Current roster is Laurie Greenland, Jackson Goldstone, Nina Hoffmann, and Greg Minnaar.

References

External links
 

Cycle manufacturers of the United States
Bicycle framebuilders
Mountain bike manufacturers
Companies based in Santa Cruz, California
Vehicle manufacturing companies established in 1993
1993 establishments in California